Elections to Coventry City Council in England were held on 1 May 2003.  Nineteen seats were up for election - the usual one third of the council, plus an additional seat in Whoberley ward, which was vacant. The Labour lost majority control of the council, but remained the largest party.

Election result

Council Composition
The composition of the council before and after the election can be found in the following table:

Ward results

References

2003
2003 English local elections
2000s in Coventry